Masters of the World, also known as Geo-Political Simulator 3, is the third installment of the Geo-political simulator series. This government simulation game, like its predecessors, puts the player in the role of any nation's head of state or head of government. French, German, Spanish, Italian, Japanese, and Russian versions of the game were also released.

Gameplay
The game has overhauled its game interface from the previous installments. Together with most features of its predecessors, the game has new features including the ability to manage more than one country simultaneously. Players are able to be the head of state of 175 countries, and make social, cultural, economical and military decisions. The possibility of a bicameral parliament and various new social policies were implemented.

Reception

Like its predecessors, the game received mixed reviews. Claudio Chianese, writing for IGN Italia, criticized the game's interface, graphics, and bugs.

References

External links

English-language forum

Windows games
Windows-only games
Real-time strategy video games
Government simulation video games
2013 video games
Video games developed in France